Manx National Heritage is the national heritage organisation for the Isle of Man. The organisation manages a significant proportion of the island’s physical heritage assets including over 3,000 acres of coastline and landscape. It holds property, archives, artwork, library and museum collections in trust for the Manx nation. It is the Isle of Man's statutory heritage agency and an Isle of Man registered charity (№ 603).

Overview
Manx National Heritage is a charitable trust, and a registered charity created by statute as (and still formally known as) the Manx Museum and National Trust. It is governed by a board of trustees.

Manx National Heritage's role is to lead the Isle of Man's community in recognising, understanding, valuing and promoting its cultural heritage and identity to a worldwide audience.

It is a designated body of the Isle of Man Government, linked via the Department of Economic Development. The Isle of Man Government provide funding for the trust's core activities and some capital projects

Manx National Heritage operates the Isle of Man's National Museum and Art Gallery, National Monuments Service, and the National Library and Archive.

Museums
Manx National Heritage runs the following museums:
Castle Rushen, Castletown
Cregneash Folk Village, Cregneash
Grove Museum, Ramsey
House of Manannan, Peel
The Great Laxey Wheel & Mines Trail, Laxey Wheel, Laxey
Manx Museum, Douglas
The Nautical Museum, Castletown
The Old Grammar School, Castletown
The Old House of Keys, Castletown
Peel Castle, Peel
Rushen Abbey, Ballasalla
Sound Centre, Calf Sound, near Cregneash
Niarbyl, Dalby Niarbyl

Site and field monuments
The following monuments are under the protection of Manx National Heritage:
Balladoole
The Braaid
Cashtal yn Ard
Cronk ny Merriu
The Manx Stone Cross Collection
Meayll Hill
St Michael's Isle

Natural heritage assets
The following properties are under the protection of Manx National Heritage:
The Ayres
The Curraghs
Eary Cushlin & Creggan Mooar
The Dhoon and Bulgham Brooghs
Killabrega
Land seaward of the Marine Drive
Lower Silverdale
Maughold Head & Brooghs and Gob ny Rona
Niarbyl
The Sound and the Calf of Man
Upper Ballaharry

References

External links

http://www.manxnationalheritage.im/
The Friends of Manx National Heritage

Government of the Isle of Man
Cultural organisations based in the Isle of Man
Manx culture
Organizations established in 1951
1951 establishments in the Isle of Man
National trusts
National heritage organizations